Guildford High School is an independent day school for girls that was founded in 1888. Approximately 1,000 girls between ages 4 to 18 attend the school from Guildford and its surrounding towns and villages. The school comprises a junior school, senior school and sixth form.

History
From the beginning, Guildford High School, founded by the Church Schools Company in 1788, was a progressive school. While some early girls' schools were designed to enhance the knowledge and skills of prospective governesses, Guildford High School sought to provide a feminine counterpart to the reformed public schools for boys. The current site on London Road was completed in 1893 and is still in use. During the post-World War II years, the school underwent rapid expansion. By the 1980s, student numbers had increased to over 600. Today the school has over 980 girls and is still part of the Company (now known as the United Church Schools Trust).

Campus 
The school possesses a sports centre off of the main campus. This includes an indoor swimming pool, gym, sports hall, fitness suite and social area. The main campus consists of the Senior school, the sixth form house (Morton House), Nightingale Road House, and the Junior school. Harper House was bought and added to the premises, also enlarging the gardens, in August 2011. The garden of the original Nightingale Road House were converted into a social area when the site was acquired in 2006.

Fees
As of 2018–19, fees for the school ranged from £4 000 to £5 000 for the junior school pupils and £6 000 for those attending the senior school.

Notable former pupils

Lorna Arnold, military historian
Call Me Loop, singer and songwriter
Pamela Cooper, socialite
Anne Davies, newsreader
Ella Hickson, playwright
Fiona Hodgson, Baroness Hodgson of Abinger, independent sector healthcare assessor
Celia Imrie, actress
Sophie Kauer, cellist and actress
Clemmie Moodie, journalist
Julia Ormond, actress
Claire Phillips, British portrait artist
Lucy Prebble, playwright
Justine Roberts, founder and chief executive of Mumsnet
Louise Roe, television presenter, fashion journalist and model
Annabel Tollman, fashion stylist
Alexandra Wedgwood, architectural historian
Julia Wilson-Dickson, voice and dialect coach
Misha Nonoo, fashion designer

References

External links 

 
Profile on the ISC website
2011 ISI Inspection Report

Schools in Guildford
Private schools in Surrey
Girls' schools in Surrey
Church of England private schools in the Diocese of Guildford
United Learning schools
Educational institutions established in 1888
1888 establishments in England